University Air Squadrons are training units under the command of No. 6 Flying Training School RAF of the Royal Air Force and their main role is to attract students into careers as RAF officers.  Primarily its goal is achieved through offering basic flying training, force development and adventure training to undergraduate students at British universities.  These units exist to provide a taste of life in the Service and to give experience to their members in preparation for taking up a career as an officer in one of the RAF's many branches.

Members are expected to attend training nights, usually on a weekly basis, as well as attending several annual training camps. The flying syllabus of 31 sorties loosely follows Elementary Flying Training (EFT) and allows a student to achieve some ten to fifteen hours of flying per year. The flying training is supplemented with ground training and adventure training, both in the UK and abroad.

UASs are part of the RAF Volunteer Reserve (RAFVR). Many are parents to Air Experience Flights (AEF) which provide experience of flying to Air Cadets. Most students hold the rank of Officer Cadet, which has the status and privileges - but not the rank - of an officer. Some, usually four/five students a year may obtain commissions in the RAF Volunteer Reserve, in the rank of Acting Pilot Officer. Medicine and dentistry students, on obtaining a Cadetship, are commissioned into the RAF in the rank of Pilot Officer, and are offered a salary. Following graduation Cadets are promoted to Flying Officer while their medical training continues, prior to commencing Initial Officer Training.

On the run-up to World War II the squadrons were an important source of pilots for the RAF during the Battle of Britain. Cadets who were already members of the RAFVR were called up for active service in the middle of studying for their degrees.

Training

Flying Training 
Most UAS training is a cut-down version of EFT and focuses on training the student to various levels of solo standard. 

Successful completion of the Core Syllabus qualifies the student pilot for the award of the Preliminary Flying Badge (PFB), or 'Budgie Wings' as they are sometimes called.  However, each student is expected to reach solo standard before the end of their second year on the squadron.  This has become one of the criteria for granting a student member a third year of membership.

For those Officer Cadets who finish the Core syllabus with time remaining on the squadron, an advanced syllabus has recently been introduced consisting of Aerobatics, Formation Flying and Low Level Navigation.  There is no specific time requirement as with the core syllabus, as progress in the advanced phase is made at a rate by which the student pilot is able to achieve the desired results.

Ground Training 
Beyond flying, UASs follow a loose Ground Training syllabus.  Although squadrons generally do not follow the syllabus as a training plan, the majority of subjects are covered at some point through the students' academic year.  These can include attending Adventure Training expeditions, both overseas and within the UK, learning drill, undertaking a fieldcraft exercise such as the recent 'STRIKE' exercises run from RAFC Cranwell, understanding the principles of air power and developing leadership skills. Air Power Force Development Experiences are also undertaken to encourage an understanding of air power in both a historical and contemporary context.

As the UAS continues to move beyond its former role of providing Elementary Flying Training to RAF Direct Entry students and UAS Students, more and more ground training opportunities are becoming available, making the UASs more suitable for Officer Cadets pursuing careers in the military other than aircrew.  However, the emphasis and priority remain on flying as the core function of each UAS. In 2003 it was estimated that 60% of pilots recruited into the Royal Air Force came through the UAS system.

UAS Officer Cadets are required to participate in a minimum amount of training: one training night a week during the university terms) which usually entails a guest speaker presenting on an aspect of the RAF or the military to develop service knowledge; and a two-week period of continuous training in the summer.  Most squadrons however also offer camps at Easter, Christmas, and September for Officer Cadets to undertake intensive blocs of sport, flying and adventure training.

Additionally, students are offered a limited number week-long Summer Vacation Attachment (SVA) at another RAF base, where they are seconded to an active regular RAF unit to learn more about their role.

Adventurous Personal Development Training (APDT) 
In accordance with the ground training syllabus, there are opportunities for Officer Cadets to participate in APDT.

There are frequent squadron expeditions in areas within the UK and overseas in Europe as well as Peru, Canada and Mongolia.  Expeditions can include all manner of adventurous training, such as mountain biking, parachuting, alpine sports, rock climbing, abseiling, white water rafting, coasteering, gorge walking and canoeing.

Sports 
In accordance with the ground training syllabus, there are many opportunities for Officer Cadets to participate in inter-UAS sports competitions.

The UASs hold annual sporting competitions such as;

Superteams - mixed events whereby squadron's compete in a test of physical strength and courage.
Swimming
Football - The Broadgate Cup (named after the Town Headquarters location of East Midlands Universities Air Squadron)
Hockey - The Balti & Korma Cup
Volleyball
Netball
Cross-country running

Units and base locations

Former squadrons

 Aberdeen Universities Air Squadron (1941-81) became Aberdeen, Dundee & St. Andrews Universities Air Squadron
 Aberdeen, Dundee & St. Andrews Universities Air Squadron (1981-2003) became East of Scotland Universities Air Squadron
 Aberystwyth University Air Squadron (1941-45)
 Queens University Air Squadron (1941-96)
 Cardiff University Air Squadron (1941-43)
 Durham University Air Squadron (1941-63) became Northumbrian Universities Air Squadron
 East Lowlands Universities Air Squadron (1969-2003) became East of Scotland Universities Air Squadron
 Edinburgh Universities Air Squadron (1941-69) became East Lowlands Universities Air Squadron
 Exeter University Air Squadron (1941-43)
 Hull University Air Squadron (1941-69) became Yorkshire Universities Air Squadron
 Leeds University Air Squadron (1941-69) became Yorkshire Universities Air Squadron
 Nottingham University Air Squadron (1941-67) became East Midlands Universities Air Squadron
 St. Andrews University Air Squadron (1941-69) became East Lowlands Universities Air Squadron
 Sheffield University Air Squadron (1941-43)
 Swansea University Air Squadron (1941-46)

See also
University Royal Naval Unit, the Royal Navy equivalent
Officers Training Corps, the British Army equivalent
List of Royal Air Force aircraft squadrons
Defence Technical Undergraduate Scheme

References

Citations

Bibliography

External links

University organisations of the British Armed Forces